The Montana House of Representatives is, with the Montana Senate, one of the two houses of the Montana Legislature. Composed of 100 members, the House elects its leadership every two years.

Composition of the House
68th Legislature – 2023–2024

In the event that the parties have a tie in number of members, the speaker and other officers are elected from the party who holds the governor's office.  Thus, during the 61st legislature from 2007 to 2009, the Montana Democratic Party led the tied legislature as a result of the victory of Democratic Governor Brian Schweitzer in the 2004 election.

Current leadership

Current members

Committees
Four administrative committees were created by state law to manage the administrative functions of the legislative branch. These committees are Audit Committee, Finance Committee, Legislative Council, and Consumer Committee.

The Montana House of Representatives has 16 standing committees. These are:
Agriculture
Appropriations
Business and Labor
Education
Ethics
Energy, Technology, and Federal Relations
Fish, Wildlife, and Parks
Human Services
Judiciary
Legislative Administration
Local Government
Natural Resources
Rules
State Administration
Taxation
Transportation

In addition, Interim Committees may be appointed each legislative session.

Past composition of the House of Representatives

See also
:Category:Montana elections
Montana Legislature
Montana Senate

References

External links

Montana House of Representatives
Members of the State House of Montana from Project Vote Smart
Montana House of Representatives from Ballotpedia

 
House of Representatives
State lower houses in the United States